

Vapor pressure

Notes 
Values are given in terms of temperature necessary to reach the specified pressure.
Valid results within the quoted ranges from most equations are included in the table for comparison.
A conversion factor is included into the original first coefficients of the equations to provide the pressure in pascals (CR2: 5.006, SMI: -0.875).
Ref. SMI uses temperature scale ITS-48. No conversion was done, which should be of little consequence however.
The temperature at standard pressure should be equal to the normal boiling point, but due to the considerable spread does not necessarily have to match values reported elsewhere.
log refers to log base 10
(T/K) refers to temperature in Kelvin (K)
(P/Pa) refers to pressure in Pascal (Pa)

References

CRC.a-m
David R. Lide (ed), CRC Handbook of Chemistry and Physics, 84th Edition. CRC Press. Boca Raton, Florida, 2003; Section 6, Fluid Properties; Vapor Pressure
Uncertainties of several degrees should generally be assumed. (e) Indicates extrapolated values beyond the region of experimental data, subject to greater uncertainty. (i) Indicates values calculated from ideal gas thermodynamic functions. (s) Indicates the substance is solid at this temperature. As quoted from these sources:
a - Lide, D.R., and Kehiaian, H.V., CRC Handbook of Thermophysical and Thermochemical Data, CRC Press, Boca Raton, Florida, 1994.
b - Stull, D., in American Institute of Physics Handbook, Third Edition, Gray, D.E., Ed., McGraw Hill, New York, 1972.
c - Hultgren, R., Desai, P.D., Hawkins, D.T., Gleiser, M., Kelley, K.K., and Wagman, D.D., Selected Values of Thermodynamic Properties of the Elements, American Society for Metals, Metals Park, OH, 1973.
d - TRCVP, Vapor Pressure Database, Version 2.2P, Thermodynamic Research Center, Texas A&M University, College Station, TX.
e - Barin, I., Thermochemical Data of Pure Substances, VCH Publishers, New York, 1993.
f - Ohse, R.W. Handbook of Thermodynamic and Transport Properties of Alkali Metals, Blackwell Scientific Publications, Oxford, 1994.
g - Gschneidner, K.A., in CRC Handbook of Chemistry and Physics, 77th Edition, p. 4-112, CRC Press, Boca Raton, Florida, 1996.
h - .
i - Wagner, W., and de Reuck, K.M., International Thermodynamic Tables of the Fluid State, No. 9. Oxygen, Blackwell Scientific Publications, Oxford, 1987.
j - Marsh, K.N., Editor, Recommended Reference Materials for the Realization of Physicochemical Properties, Blackwell Scientific Publications, Oxford, 1987.
k - 
l - 
m -

CR2
David R. Lide (ed), CRC Handbook of Chemistry and Physics, 84th Edition, online version. CRC Press. Boca Raton, Florida, 2003; Section 4, Properties of the Elements and Inorganic Compounds; Vapor Pressure of the Metallic Elements
The equations reproduce the observed pressures to an accuracy of ±5% or better. Coefficients from this source:

KAL
National Physical Laboratory, Kaye and Laby Tables of Physical and Chemical Constants; Section 3.4.4, D. Ambrose, Vapour pressures from 0.2 to 101.325 kPa. Retrieved Jan 2006.

SMI.a-s
W.E. Forsythe (ed.), Smithsonian Physical Tables 9th ed., online version (1954; Knovel 2003). Table 363, Evaporation of Metals
The equations are described as reproducing the observed pressures to a satisfactory degree of approximation. From these sources:
a - K.K. Kelley, Bur. Mines Bull. 383, (1935).
b - 
c - Brewer, The thermodynamic and physical properties of the elements, Report for the Manhattan Project, (1946).
d - 
e - 
f - 
g - ;
h - 
i - .
j - 
k - Int. National Critical Tables, vol. 3, p. 306, (1928).
l - 
m - 
n - 
o - 
p - 
q - 
r - 
s - H.A. Jones, I. Langmuir, Gen. Electric Rev., vol. 30, p. 354, (1927).

See also 

Properties of chemical elements
Chemical element data pages